Noeggerathia is an extinct genus of noeggerathialean plant that lived during the Late Carboniferous and Early Permian periods.

Description
Noeggerathia could grow to be 3 ft, 3 in tall. It is known for its compound leaves, each possessing two rows of leaflets which composed a 12-inch frond. Noeggerathia may also have possessed a short trunk.

The genus may have possessed strobili at the ends of its branches for reproductive purposes. Biseriate sporophylls existed on either side of the cones. It has been previously suggested that Noeggerathiostrobus may have been borne at the end of Noeggerathia'''s stems, although it is more likely that Noeggerathiostrobus was borne closer to the base of Noeggerathia.

TaxonomyNoeggerathia was named after Johann Jakob Nöggerath, a geologist from Germany. The genus was described in 1820 by Kaspar Maria von Sternberg.Noeggerathia and noeggerathialeans in general have been described as difficult to classify as early as 1906 and as recently as 2009. In 1906, the genus was believed to belong to Cycadaceae, a family which currently consists only of Cycas.

The species described under Noeggerathia include the following:Noeggerathia dickeri HorowitzNoeggerathia foliosa Sternb.Noeggerathia intermedia Feistm.Noeggerathia obovata Carruth.Noeggerathia speciosa Ettingsh.Noeggerathia zalesskyi FissunenkoNoeggerathia zamitoides Sterzel

Fossil sites
Specimens of Noeggerathia have been discovered worldwide. As of 1906, Noeggerathia was known from finds in the European Coal Measures, and there it was considered to be rare.

Several well-preserved specimens of Noeggerathia and related plants have been discovered in the Bohemian Massif, with N. foliosa having the most complete fossil record in that area. N. dickeri'' has been described from the Upper Sandstone Formation of the Sinai Peninsula.

References 

Pennsylvanian plants
Fossil taxa described in 1820
Pennsylvanian first appearances
Cisuralian genus extinctions
Paleozoic life of Nova Scotia
Paleozoic life of Prince Edward Island